Alexander Büchler (24 September 1869 in Fülek (Fiľakovo), Kingdom of Hungary – July 1944 in Auschwitz) was a Hungarian rabbi and educator.

He is a son of the Talmudist rabbi Phineas Büchler of Mór. He was educated at the gymnasium in Székesfehérvár and at the university and the seminary of Budapest; he received the degree of Ph.D. in 1893, and was ordained as rabbi in 1895. In 1897 he was called to Keszthely.

Literary works 
Büchler's works include essays on the history of the Jews in Hungary, published in the "Magyar Zsidó Szemle" and the "Österreichische Wochenschrift", and the following books:

 "Niederlassungen der Juden in Europa im XVI. und XVII. Jahrhundert, mit Besonderer Rücksichtauf Ungarn", Budapest, 1893 (in Hungarian);
 "Schay Lamoreh", "Kolel Miktebe Ḥakme Yisrael", Budapest, 1895 (in Hebrew);
 "History of the Jews in Budapest", 1901 (in Hungarian)

References

Inline citations

Sources referenced

By : Isidore Singer & Ludwig Venetianer: JewishEncyclopedia.com - BÜCHLER, ALEXANDER at www.jewishencyclopedia.com

External links 
 Magyar Életrajzi Lexikon 1000–1990 at www.mek.iif.hu  

1869 births
1944 deaths
People from Fiľakovo
Hungarian rabbis
Hungarian people who died in Auschwitz concentration camp
Jewish educators
Hungarian educators
Hungarian civilians killed in World War II
Hungarian Jews who died in the Holocaust